National Public School (or NPS-RNR or NPS-R) is a school located in Bangalore, India, established in 1959 by K. P. Gopalkrishna. The campus, which consists of four buildings, is located on Chord Road, 5th Block, Rajajinagar.

House system

Students are divided into four houses which have been assigned a colour each. They are, "Phoenix" (blue), "Centaur" (red), "Pegasus" (yellow), and "Orion" (green). Every year, the houses compete for two trophies: the Sports Cup (awarded for athletics performance), and the House Cup (awarded for other merits such as drama, science, mathematics, etc).

Facilities
The school has two auditoriums. It has senior and junior science laboratories, a computer laboratory and other facilities like libraries, art rooms and a music room.

Sports
There are sports events conducted for classes 1 to 12 and kindergarten. Volleyball, basketball, football and throw-ball are the permitted outdoor sports, along with badminton, chess and annual races.

School events
The school organizes a bi-annual inter-school competition. The competition, known as "Napsonic", involves teams from only the sister schools competing to win prizes for events. To ensure fair play, the students of National Public School, Rajajinagar do not participate in the fests that the school sponsors.

Each year, the school organises a Graduation Day program to bid adieu to the graduating students of grade 12, during the course of which students hold lit lamps.

Intra-school and Inter-school MUNs knows as "R-MUN" have been conducted by the school since 2017.

Sister schools
 National Public School, Koramangala
 National Public School, Indiranagar
 National Public School, Chennai
 National Academy For Learning
 The International School Bangalore
 National Public School, Mysore
 National Public School, ITPL
 National Public School, HSR
 National Public School International, Singapore
 National Public School, Jalahalli

Notable alumni
 Ashwini Nachappa, international athlete from Karnataka
 Ambi Subramaniam, violinist
 Ravi Chandran, Kannada film actor
 Bindu Subramaniam, Carnatic vocalist
 D. K. Shivakumar, president of Karnataka Pradesh Congress Committee
 D. K. Suresh, Member of Parliament, Bangalore Rural Lok Sabha Constituency
 Divita Rai, Liva Miss Diva Universe 2022

References

External links
 

High schools and secondary schools in Bangalore
1959 establishments in Mysore State
Educational institutions established in 1959